The Waianae Sugar Company, founded in 1878, was the first major sugar plantation on Oahu, Hawaii.

History 

In 1878, Judge Hermann Widemann planted his first crop in Wai'anae, eleven years before the creation of the Oahu Railway and Land Company, and seventeen years before the OR&L would reach the sugar mill. Waianae Sugar Company's plantation cultivated land in three valleys, Makaha, Lualualei, and Wai'anae. Having a  narrow gauge railway line, it was the only sugar plantation on the island whose tracks could not connect to the OR&L's tracks. Despite struggles for water, this company lasted 69 years, closing down in 1947, the same year as the Oahu Railway's closure.

By 1890, sugar cane was planted on 600 acres with a yield of 2,500 tons. The company had 350 workers and three locomotives to transport the cane over 12 miles of narrow gauge track.

Locomotives 
The first locomotive was imported from John Fowler & Co. at Leeds, England. It had to be disassembled and re-assembled to get it ashore. Only then it was noted that it did not match the  narrow gauge track. The undercarriage had to be dismantled, machined to size, and then commissioned.

References 

Sugar companies of the United States
Defunct companies based in Hawaii
Waianae Range
Transportation in Honolulu County, Hawaii
Defunct Hawaii railroads
Sugar mill railways
Narrow gauge railroads in Hawaii
2 ft 6 in gauge railways in the United States
Food and drink companies established in 1878
Food and drink companies disestablished in 1947
Railway companies established in 1878
Railway companies disestablished in 1947
1878 establishments in Hawaii
1947 disestablishments in Hawaii